Koimoi is a Bollywood entertainment website providing Bollywood news, box-office reports and film reviews. In January 2021, its Alexa ranking in India was 2530.

Origin
On 23 November 2009, Contest2win.com and Komal Nahta's Faith Entertainment jointly launched the website Koimoi.com. Komal Nahta, who was a film trade analyst, is co-founder and editor of Koimoi. The other co-founder of Koimoi is Satish Iyer.

References

External links
 

Film box office
Indian film websites
Hindi-language mass media
Online film databases